Ivan Rodney Winstanley (born 25 August 1976 in Johannesburg, Gauteng) is a retired South African Association football defender who last played for National First Division club Thanda Royal Zulu. His twin brother is Neil Winstanley.

Year joined Thanda: 2009
Previous clubs: Moroka Swallows, Maritzburg United, Wits University, Kaizer Chiefs

Notes

1976 births
Living people
South African soccer players
South African twins
Bidvest Wits F.C. players
Kaizer Chiefs F.C. players
Moroka Swallows F.C. players
Association football defenders
Soccer players from Johannesburg
Maritzburg United F.C. players
Thanda Royal Zulu F.C. players
White South African people
Twin sportspeople